Yevgeny Yevgenyevich Shabayev (24 April 1973 – 5 August 1998; alternate transliterations Yevgeni, Evgeny, Evgeni, Chabaev) was a Russian artistic gymnast. He won a silver with his team at the 1994 Team World Championships, and he was the bronze medalist in the all-around at the 1995 World Championships. He was only the alternate to Russia's 1996 Olympic team due to a shoulder injury that required surgery. Injuries also kept him off the team for the 1997 World Championships.

Shabayev died of a heart attack on 5 August 1998. His funeral was held six days later, and gymnasts Alexei Nemov, Nikolai Kryukov, Elena Grosheva and Roza Galieva were in attendance.

References

External links 
Profile
Biography
Photos

1973 births
1998 deaths
Gymnasts from Moscow
Medalists at the World Artistic Gymnastics Championships
Russian male artistic gymnasts
20th-century Russian people